2006 S.League was the eleventh season of Singapore's professional football league. It was won by Singapore Armed Forces, which was their fifth league title.

Changes from 2005
 Paya Lebar Punggol merged with the returning Sengkang Marine to form Sengkang Punggol.
 Gombak United also returned to the league after pulling out in 2002.
 Sporting Afrique were a foreign team made up of players from four different African countries – Kenya, Nigeria, Cameroon and Ghana.
 Sinchi went out of operation at the end of 2005 season.

Foreign players
Each club is allowed to have a maximum of 4 foreign players, except Young Lions.

 Albirex Niigata (S) and Sporting Afrique are not allowed to hire any foreigners.

League table

Top goalscorers

References

 S.League 2006 (Note section on top scorers is incomplete (till 20 August).)

Singapore Premier League seasons
1
Sing
Sing